Parnell Gourlay (3 February 1879 – 15 November 1958) was a Canadian amateur soccer player who competed in the 1904 Summer Olympics. He died on November 15, 1958, in Vancouver, British Columbia at age 79.

References

1879 births
1958 deaths
Canadian soccer players
Olympic gold medalists for Canada
Olympic soccer players of Canada
Olympic medalists in football
Footballers at the 1904 Summer Olympics
Association football defenders
Medalists at the 1904 Summer Olympics
20th-century Canadian people